The 2022 Danish Speedway season was the 2022 season of speedway in Denmark.

Sønderjylland Elite Speedway (SES) won the Super League and were declared the winners of the Danish Speedway League.

Earlier in August 2022, Nordjsyk Elite Speedway were forced to drop out of the league due to financial problems. The DMU stated that they would not be able to return to the league until 2024. The Nordjysk results were expunged from the league table.

Individual

Danish Individual Championship

Danish U21 Championship
 winner - Benjamin Basso

Team

Danish Speedway League 

+ results expunged

Semi-finals (teams ranked 3-6)

Final

References

Speedway leagues
Professional sports leagues in Denmark
Danish
2022 in Danish speedway